Three Husbands is a 1951 American comedy film directed by Irving Reis and starring Eve Arden, Ruth Warrick, and Emlyn Williams.

Plot 
When a recently deceased playboy, Max, gets to heaven, he is granted a wish.  His request: to watch his three best friends, with whom he regularly played poker, for the next 24 hours. That day, each man would receive a letter; tomorrow, Max's will is to be read.  Each letter states that he had an affair with that man's wife, all of with whom he was close.  With one, Max attended Friday symphony matinees and had tea afterwards; with another, he went to night clubs and taught French; the last, he repeatedly hired as his nurse through his long battle with heart disease.

Each husband reacts differently, as does each wife when she discovers that something has happened to make her husband distrust her.  At the end of the 24 hours, each couple declares their intention to divorce, mistrust and disbelief having split each relationship.  The lawyer reads the will, stating that Max's great fortune has been left to the three wives, as he believes that marriage is stronger when a wife is not dependent on her husband.  It states in his will that Max wrote the letters to show each of his friends how much his wife was worth, as each had begun to take her for granted; he believed that jealousy was the perfect motivator to make someone re-appreciate something/someone.

Each wife reiterates her intention to divorce; each husband apologizes and begs her to reconsider.  The three couples all reconcile, everyone grateful for having had Max and for his final gift to them - each other.

Cast 
Eve Arden as Lucille McCabe
Ruth Warrick as Jane Evans
Vanessa Brown as Mary Whittaker
Howard Da Silva as Dan McCabe
Shepperd Strudwick as Arthur Evans
Robert Karnes as Kenneth Whittaker
Emlyn Williams as Maxwell Bard
Billie Burke as Mrs. Jenny Bard Whittaker
Louise Erickson as Matilda Clegg
Jonathan Hale as Edward Wurdeman, Attorney at Law
Jane Darwell as Mrs. Wurdeman

Soundtrack 
"Poor Chap" (Music by Herschel Burke Gilbert, lyrics by Edward Eliscu)

Reception 
The unnamed New York Times reviewer compared it unfavorably to the similar A Letter to Three Wives, which Three Husbands screenwriter Vera Caspary also had a hand in, writing " where 'A Letter to Three Wives' was a dramatic, biting commentary, which often was uproariously funny, 'Three Husbands' is merely a slick sleight-of-hand, ably performed, but chucklesome only in spots."

References

External links 

1951 films
1951 comedy films
American black-and-white films
American comedy films
Films about the afterlife
Films directed by Irving Reis
Films scored by Herschel Burke Gilbert
United Artists films
1950s English-language films
1950s American films